Antonio Baroni (1678 – 31 December 1746) was an Italian painter of the late-Baroque period, active in Verona. He trained with Simone Brentana in Verona, and then in Bologna with Marcantonio Franceschini. He painted Sacrifice of Isaac for the oratorio di San Biago. He painted a Nativity for the church of San Alessio. He painted a San Simone Apostle for the Oratory of San Simone Apostolo, as well as a David and the angel with whips

Sources

1678 births
1746 deaths
17th-century Italian painters
Italian male painters
18th-century Italian painters
Painters from Verona
Italian Baroque painters
18th-century Italian male artists